The Council election held in Wolverhampton on Thursday 7 May 1987 were one third, and 20 of the 60 seats were up for election.

During the 1987 election the Conservatives gained the Bilston North, Graiseley, Wednesfield North and Wednesfield South seats from Labour whilst the SDP–Liberal Alliance gained Heath Town, East Park and Spring Vale wards from Labour.

Prior to the election the constitution of the Council was:

Labour 37
Conservative 19
Alliance 4

Following the election the constitution of the Council was:

Labour 30
Conservative 23
Alliance 7

Election result

1987
1987 English local elections
1980s in the West Midlands (county)